The 15th Alberta Legislative Assembly was in session from February 13, 1964, to April 14, 1967, with the membership of the assembly determined by the results of the 1963 Alberta general election held on June 17, 1963. The Legislature officially resumed on February 13, 1964, and continued until the fifth session was prorogued on April 11, 1967, and dissolved on April 14, 1967, prior to the 1967 Alberta general election.

Alberta's fifteenth government was controlled by the majority Social Credit Party for the eighth time, led by Premier Ernest Manning who would go on to be the longest serving Premier in Alberta history. The Official Opposition was led by Michael Maccagno of the Alberta Liberal Party who were elected to two seats in the Legislature.  The Speaker was Arthur J. Dixon, who would remain the speaker until the fall of the Social Credit government after the 1971 Alberta general election. The Liberals held opposition status with just two seats, and the Coalition party held third place in the Legislature.

Standings changes since the 15th general election

Members elected
For complete electoral history, see individual districts.

References

Further reading

External links
Alberta Legislative Assembly
Legislative Assembly of Alberta Members Book
By-elections 1905 to present

15